The 2015–16 Scottish Cup was the 131st season of Scotland's most prestigious football knockout competition. The tournament was sponsored by bookmaker William Hill in what was the fifth season of a five-year partnership. The final was contested between second-tier clubs (Hibernian and Rangers) for the first time ever with no Premiership clubs reaching the final.

The defending champions were Inverness Caledonian Thistle, who defeated Falkirk in the 2015 final, but were eventually knocked out in the Quarter Final after a replay by eventual champions, Hibernian.

Media coverage
From round four onwards, selected matches from the Scottish Cup were broadcast live in Ireland and the UK by BBC Scotland and Sky Sports. BBC Scotland had the option to show one tie per round with Sky Sports showing two ties per round with one replay; also, Sky Sports broadcast both semi-finals live with one also on BBC Scotland and both channels screened the final live.

Calendar
The calendar for the 2015–16 Scottish Cup qualifying rounds, as announced by Scottish Football Association.

Preliminary rounds

Preliminary round 1
The preliminary round 1 took place on Saturday 15 August 2015. The round had 15 clubs which included 5 matches and 5 byes to the Second Preliminary Round. The teams competing in this round were made up of teams from the Scottish Highland Football League, Scottish Lowland Football League, ESL, SSL, Scottish Junior FA and the Scottish Amateur FA. It was the first time that the winners of the Scottish Amateur Cup had participated in the Scottish Cup.

Draw
Hawick Royal Albert, Kelty Hearts, Auchinleck Talbot, Hermes and Lothian Thistle Hutchison Vale all received byes to the preliminary round 2.

Matches

Preliminary round 2

The preliminary round 2 took place on Saturday 5 September 2015. The round had 10 clubs which included 5 matches. The teams competing in this round were made up of 5 winners from Round 1 and the 5 Byes from Round one.

Draw

Matches

Replay

First round

Draw
There were 18 ties taking place in Round 1 of the Scottish Cup. The draw took place on Tuesday, 28 August 2015.

Teams in italics were not known at the time of the draw. Teams in Bold advanced to the second round.

Matches

Replays

Second round

Draw
There were 16 ties taking place in Round 2 of the Scottish Cup. The draw took place on Thursday, 1 October 2015.

Teams in italics were not known at the time of the draw. Teams in Bold advanced to the third round.

Matches

Replays

Third round

Draw
There were 16 ties taking place in Round 3 of the Scottish Cup. The draw took place on Thursday, 29 October 2015 and was conducted by former Scotland manager Alex McLeish, who won the Scottish Cup both as a player and a manager.

Teams in italics were not known at the time of the draw. Teams in Bold advanced to the fourth round.

Matches

Replays

Fourth round

Draw
There were 16 ties taking place in Round 4 of the Scottish Cup. The draw took place on Tuesday, 1 December 2015.

Teams in italics were not known at the time of the draw. Teams in Bold advanced to the fifth round.

Matches

Replays

Fifth round

Draw
There were 8 ties taking place in Round 5 of the Scottish Cup. The draw took place on Monday, 11 January 2016.

Teams in italics were not known at the time of the draw. Teams in Bold advanced to the quarter-finals.

Matches

Replays

Quarter-finals

Draw
There were four ties taking place in the quarter-finals of the Scottish Cup. The draw took place on Monday, 8 February 2016 and was conducted by Scottish Cup winner and former Celtic midfielder Ľubomír Moravčík. The draw, broadcast live on Sky Sports News, has become infamous since it had to be aborted due to one ball breaking open in the pot. After a delay, the draw was completed successfully at the second attempt.

All matches were played on the weekend of 5/6 March 2016.

Teams in italics were not known at the time of the draw. Teams in Bold advanced to the semi-finals.

Matches

Replays

Semi-finals

Draw
The draw took place on Sunday, 6 March 2016 live on Sky Sports News HQ. Both matches were played on the weekend of 16/17 April 2016.

Teams in italics were not known at the time of the draw. Teams in Bold advanced to the final.

Matches

Final

Statistics

Top goalscorers

NB: Scorers include only those goals from players which were scored from the second round onwards

References

External links
Scottish Cup Archive Scottish Football Association
William Hill Scottish Cup Competition 2015-16 Scottish Football Association (Archived)
William Hill Scottish Cup Preliminary Rounds drawn Scottish Football Association, 10 July 2015

Scottish Cup seasons
2015–16 in Scottish football cups
Scottish Cup